/ "Deep Mind" is the 13th single by the Japanese band Buono!, released in Japan on January 18, 2012.

Composition
As the band members pointed out in their interviews to CDJournal, "Hatsukoi Cider" is a refreshing up-tempo track, while "Deep Mind", being a theme song for a horror movie, is a dark composition, which they performed in low, deep voices.

Music video
The music video for "Hatsukoi Cider" features Hisako Tabuchi of the rock bands Bloodthirsty Butchers and Toddle on guitar. It features the members performing in a grey-lit room.

The music video for "Deep Mind" features Buono! singing in a dark area. A "MOVIE Ver." was released on the Event V of the single. A majority of it is the same as the music video but intercuts with scenes from the film Gomennasai, which Buono! themselves starred in.

Tie-ups and theme songs
"Hatsukoi Cider / Deep Mind" is Buono!'s first double-A side single. The song "Hatsukoi Cider" was used as the closing theme for the television series Sūgaku Joshi Gakuen, in which Buono! members, as well as other members of Hello! Project, played (the opening song being "Pyoco Pyoco Ultra" by Morning Musume). "Hatsukoi Cider" was also chosen as the January 2012 closing theme for the Nippon Television musical variety show Happy Music, the successor of the musical program Ongaku Senshi Music Fighter.

The song "Deep Mind" was also used as a closing theme, for the horror film Gomennasai, which starred all three Buono! members. The song was unveiled at the movie's avant-premiere held in Tokyo on October 8, 2011.

Release information
"Hatsukoi Cider / Deep Mind", released in Japan on January 18, 2012, is the band's 13th single and third single on the record label Zetima. There are 2 versions available: Regular Edition (CD only) and Limited Edition, the latter includes a DVD with a special version of the music video for "Hatsukoi Cider".

The music videos for both songs were released on the DVD single "Single V 'Hatsukoi Cider / Deep Mind'" a week after the CD single, on January 25.

As usual for Hello! Project singles, there also was another edition of the DVD single, a so-called Event V, made. It was sold at the Hatsukoi Cider / Deep Mind release event, held on February 26, and contained more versions of the music videos.

Artwork 
The Event V cover resembles the cover of Elvis Costello's debut album My Aim Is True. The Single V cover resembles the cover of The Beatles album Help!.

Chart performance
The CD single ranked at number 7 in the Oricon Weekly Singles Chart in its debut week.

The DVD single "Single V 'Hatsukoi Cider / Deep Mind'" peaked at number 40 in the Oricon Weekly Combined DVD Chart.

Track listing

CD single

DVD singles

Single V
The corresponding DVD single is titled "Single V 'Hatsukoi Cider / Deep Mind'". It contains the music videos for both tracks and 3 special versions of the music video for "Hatsukoi Cider".

Event V
The DVD single released for the Hatsukoi Cider / Deep Mind release event is titled "Event V 'Hatsukoi Cider / Deep Mind'".

Charts

References

External links
 CD single, profile on the Up-Front Works official website
 CD single, profile on the Hello! Project official website
 DVD single "Single V 'Hatsukoi Cider / Deep Mind'" profile on the Hello! Project official website
 Event V announcement on the Hello! Project official website

2012 singles
Japanese-language songs
Buono! songs
Zetima Records singles
Songs written for films
Japanese television drama theme songs
Japanese film songs